Greimerath is an Ortsgemeinde – a municipality belonging to a Verbandsgemeinde, a kind of collective municipality – in the Bernkastel-Wittlich district in Rhineland-Palatinate, Germany.

Geography 

The municipality lies in the Eifel. The municipal area is 52% wooded. To the east runs the Autobahn A 1. Greimerath belongs to the Verbandsgemeinde Wittlich-Land.

History 
In 1144, Greimerath had its first documentary mention. Beginning in 1794, Greimerath lay under French rule. In 1814 it was assigned to the Kingdom of Prussia at the Congress of Vienna. Since 1947, it has been part of the then newly founded state of Rhineland-Palatinate.

Politics

Municipal council 
The council is made up of 6 council members, who were elected by majority vote at the municipal election held on 7 June 2009, and the honorary mayor as chairman.

Coat of arms 
The municipality's arms might be described thus: Per fess sable a demi-dragon argent armed and langued gules, and argent two adzes in saltire azure.

Culture and sightseeing 
The church comes from the year 1760. Beside the Baroque church stands the rectory with its accompanying garden. In 2005, the rectory (without the garden) was sold into private ownership. The parish priest for the parishes of Greimerath, Laufeld and Niederöfflingen lives at the rectory in Laufeld.

The parish garden was converted by the specially founded Cultural Club into a meeting, recreational and cultural place. A signpost on the nearby cycle path lures many cyclists and hikers into this garden with its native herbs and plants. A fountain, an outdoor chess set and many places to sit offer all visitors a chance to recover from everyday stresses.

Further reading 
Gemeinde Greimerath (Hg.): 850 Jahre Greimerath - Ein kleines Eifeldorf feiert seine Geschichte. Greimerath/Eifel 1994

References

External links 
Municipality’s official webpage 

Bernkastel-Wittlich